Mary Ann-Catrin Stävin (born 20 August 1957) is a Swedish actress, model and beauty queen who won Miss World 1977 in London. She is the third Swedish woman to win the Miss World crown.

Acting career
Among her more prominent acting roles are bit parts in two of Roger Moore's James Bond films. In Octopussy (1983), she played an Octopussy girl, and in A View to a Kill (1985), she played agent Kimberley Jones. She had supporting roles as the character Tanya in the 1986 horror movie House, which starred William Katt, and the horror film Open House (1987), starring Joseph Bottoms. Her other films included Alien Terminator (1988) with Roger Moore's daughter Deborah, The Opponent (1988), Strike Commando 2 (1988), Born to Fight (1989) and Howling V: The Rebirth (1989). She also played the Icelandic businesswoman Heba in Twin Peaks (Season 1, Ep. 6).

In addition to acting, Stävin released the exercise album Shape Up and Dance with George Best. and appeared in two music videos for Adam Ant. These were "Ant Rap" (1981) and "Strip" (1983).

Filmography

Film

Television

References

External links

 Mary Stavin - From Sweden With Love

1957 births
Living people
Miss Sweden winners
Miss World winners
Miss World 1977 delegates
People from Örebro
Swedish film actresses
20th-century Swedish actresses
Swedish emigrants to the United States